The velvet-fronted euphonia (Euphonia concinna) is a species of bird in the family Fringillidae, having recently been moved there from the Thraupidae.

It is endemic to Colombia. Its natural habitats are subtropical or tropical dry forests and heavily degraded former forest.

References

velvet-fronted euphonia
Birds of the Colombian Andes
Endemic birds of Colombia
velvet-fronted euphonia
velvet-fronted euphonia
Taxonomy articles created by Polbot